The 2021–22 1. FC Schweinfurt 05 season is the 116th season in the history of the association football club based in Schweinfurt, Germany. In addition to the domestic league, Schweinfurt also participates in this season's edition of the Bavarian Cup. This is the 85th season for Schweinfurt in the Sachs-Stadion. The season covers a period from 1 July 2021 to 30 June 2022.

Players

Squad
|

Out on loan

Transfers

In

Out

Competitions

Regionalliga Bayern

Results by round

Matches
League fixtures as announced by BFV:

Bavarian Cup

Bavarian Cup fixtures as announced by BFV:

References

1. FC Schweinfurt 05 seasons
Schweinfurt